Siau is an island in North Sulawesi, Indonesia, located in the Sangir Archipelago approximately  off the northern tip of Sulawesi in the Celebes Sea. Covering a land area of 160 km2, it is the main island of the Sitaro Islands Regency of North Sulawesi Province.

The northern part of the island forms the volcano known as Karangetang (Api Siau), which is one of Indonesia's most active volcanoes.

The population of Siau island was 40,758 at the 2010 Census and 45,804 at the 2020 Census. The island has been noted as the home of the Siau Island tarsier.

Communities
Communities on the island include the town of Ulu Siau and the villages of Baru, Batuwawang, Bebali (Bubali), Beong, Hiu, Kahawungan, Kanawong, Korakora, Lai, Lehi, Ondang, Ondong, Paniki, Pehe, Peliang, Salili, Tempuna and Toto. The island is administratively divided into 6 districts of the Sitaro Islands Regency.

See also

Temboko Lehi Beach
Trip to Siau Island

References

Landforms of the Celebes Sea
Landforms of North Sulawesi
Sangihe Islands
Populated places in Indonesia